This is a following list of awards and nominations received by South Korean filmmaker Bong Joon-ho.

Accolades

Listicles

Notes

References

Bong, Joon-ho, list of awards and nominations received by